The 440 Alliance is an American cello rock band from Arlington, Texas consisting of five cellists and a percussionist. The group formed in 2004 and is known for their diverse approach to the cello, incorporating electric effects, turntables, piano, and mallet percussion. They received national exposure on NPR's All Songs Considered, the Drew Pearson Show on Fox Sports, and on Fox's musical reality show, The Next Great American Band.  The group has performed at a number of private parties for celebrities including Troy Aikman (Former NFL Quarterback for the Dallas Cowboys), Jerry Jones (Dallas Cowboys owner), John Kirtland (Former drummer for Deep Blue Something and owner of Kirtland Records), Janine Turner (from Northern Exposure), members of the Dallas Symphony Orchestra, as well as the Dallas, TX movie premiere for the film The Soloist (starring Jamie Foxx and Robert Downey Jr.).

Current members
Drew Johnson (High Notes) – Cello, Pedal FX
Andrew Walton (Captain Bringdown) – Cello, Talk Box
Nathan Keefer (Major Scales) – Cello, Piano, Acoustic Guitar
Neil Fong Gilfillan (Maestro Fong) – Cello, Turntables
Jeff Harvick (Kid Bach) - Cello, Theremin
Brandon Vanderford (Lieutenant Branderford) – Drums, Mallet Percussion

Former members
Cody MacCafferty (Commander Cody) – Drums
Benom Plumb - Drums

Discography
Top 440 (15th Anniversary CD), 2020
Immigrant Song - Led Zeppelin
Dreams - The Cranberries
More Than A Feeling - Boston
Good Vibrations - The Beach Boys
Billie Jean - Michael Jackson
The Longest Time - Billy Joel
Crazy Train - Ozzy Osbourne
God Only Knows - The Beach Boys
The Final Countdown - Europe
Home Sweet Home - Mötley Crüe
Welcome To Your Doom
Eye of the Tiger (Live) - Survivor
Shut-Uptown Funk & Dance (Live Medley) - Bruno Mars / Walk The Moon
Canon in Astley (Live) - Rick Astley
Just What I Needed (Live) - The Cars

Crooked Bridge, 2010
Bogus Gravitas
Sweet Cello 'O' Mine - Guns N' Roses
The Gold Cartridge (Zelda) - Koji Kondo
Fugue 'N Blues
The Price Is Wrong - Bob Israel
Livin' On A Prayer - Bon Jovi
Crooked Bridge Jam
All You Need Is Love - The Beatles

The 440 Alliance, 2006
This is Gonna Rock!
440 Jam
Black Hole Sun - Soundgarden
Tango de la Turntable
Stairway to Heaven - Led Zeppelin
Title
I Am the Walrus - The Beatles
¡Te Gusta 440!
Bohemian Rhapsody - Queen
Black Tux (Hidden Track)
surlaW ehT mA I (Hidden Track)

Playin' Cellos, 2005
Pulp Fact (Miserlou) - Dick Dale and the Deltones
Don't Stop Believin' - Journey
Classic Crunk
A Day in the Life/Sergeant Pepper's Lonely Hearts Club Band (Reprise) (Live) - The Beatles
Super Mario Bros. (Live) - Koji Kondo
440 Jam (live)

References

External links
Official site

Articles
 NPR Music - The 440 Alliance: 'This is Gonna Rock!'
Pegasus News - The 440 Alliance review
The Shorthorn - North Texas Band Reaches Reality TV Realm
 The North Texas Daily - 4 cellists, percussionist see early success

Listening
Audio Samples on MySpace

Video
Next Great American Band audition tape
The 440 Alliance performs at Troy Aikman's Super Bowl Party

Rock music groups from Texas
American rock cellists
Musical groups established in 2004
Culture of Arlington, Texas